Pavol Šuhaj (born 16 April 1981) is a Slovak footballer who played in the Football League for Crewe Alexandra. He also played in the Slovak Super Liga for Laugaricio Trenčín and the Northern Premier League for Nantwich Town. Šuhaj was a forward.

Playing career
Šuhaj joined Football League Championship club Crewe Alexandra in July 2005 from Slovak Super Liga side Laugaricio Trenčín. He made eight appearances in two seasons with the club before being released at the end of the 2006–07 campaign. Šuhaj had a trial with Stafford Rangers that summer, and then signed for Nantwich Town. In one season with the club he helped them win the Cheshire Senior Cup, where he scored a hat-trick in the final, and the Northern Premier League Division One South play-offs. Šuhaj was released at the end of the 2007–08 campaign and returned to Slovakia to play for Mesto Prievidza.

References

External links

1981 births
Living people
People from Lipany
Sportspeople from the Prešov Region
Slovak footballers
Association football forwards
Partizán Bardejov players
MŠK Rimavská Sobota players
Patraikos F.C. players
AS Trenčín players
Crewe Alexandra F.C. players
Nantwich Town F.C. players
FC Baník Prievidza players
Slovak Super Liga players
English Football League players
Northern Premier League players
Slovak expatriate footballers
Expatriate footballers in Greece
Slovak expatriate sportspeople in Greece
Expatriate footballers in England
Slovak expatriate sportspeople in England